Hollybush may refer to:

Hollybush, an area of Newport, Wales, United Kingdom
Hollybush, Worcestershire, United Kingdom
Hollybush railway station, United Kingdom
Hollybush, Kentucky, United States
Hollybush, a common name for the plant Tetracoccus ilicifolius
Hollybush Mansion, Glassboro, New Jersey, listed on the NRHP in Gloucester County

See also
Hollybush Hill (disambiguation)